The 2010–11 Mississippi RiverKings season was the 19th season of the Central Hockey League (CHL) franchise in Southaven, Mississippi.

Regular season
After an 11-11-1 start, the RiverKings changed coaches on December 14, 2010, head coach and director of hockey operations Kevin Kaminski was released from his position and was replaced by Paul Gardner.

Conference standings

Awards and records

Awards

Milestones

Transactions
The RiverKings have been involved in the following transactions during the 2010–11 season.

Final roster

See also
 2010–11 CHL season

References

External links
 2010–11 Mississippi RiverKings season at Pointstreak

M
M